Globocassidulina is a genus of foraminifera.

Globocassidulina is included in the Cassidulinidae.  Related genera include Cassidulina, Cassidulinella, Favocassidulina and Buriela.

Species 
 Globocassidulina algida (Cushman, 1944)
 Globocassidulina arata (Finlay, 1939) †
 Globocassidulina biora (Crespin, 1960)
 Globocassidulina bisecta Nomura, 1983
 Globocassidulina brocha (Poag, 1966)
 Globocassidulina canalisuturata Eade, 1967
 Globocassidulina crassa (d'Orbigny, 1839)
 Globocassidulina cuneata (Finlay, 1940) †
 Globocassidulina decorata (Sidebottom, 1910)
 Globocassidulina depressa (Asano & Nakamura, 1937)
 Globocassidulina dissidens McCulloch, 1977
 Globocassidulina elegans (Sidebottom, 1910)
 Globocassidulina fava (Saidova, 1975)
 Globocassidulina gemma (Todd, 1954)
 Globocassidulina hooperi Clark, 1994
 Globocassidulina ikebei Nishimura et al., 1977
 Globocassidulina jamesoni (McCulloch, 1977)
 Globocassidulina kattoi (Takayanagi, 1953)
 Globocassidulina minima (Saidova, 1975)
 Globocassidulina minuta (Cushman, 1933)
 Globocassidulina mucronata Nomura, 1983
 Globocassidulina murrhyna (Schwager, 1866)
 Globocassidulina murrhyna (Saidova, 1975)
 Globocassidulina neobrocha Nomura, 1983
 Globocassidulina notalnella (Saidova, 1975)
 Globocassidulina oriangulata Belford, 1966
 Globocassidulina paratortuosa (Kuwano, 1954)
 Globocassidulina parva (Asano & Nakamura, 1937)
 Globocassidulina parviapertura Nomura, 1983
 Globocassidulina producta (Chapman & Parr, 1937)
 Globocassidulina pseudocrassa (Hornibrook, 1961) †
 Globocassidulina setanaensis (Asano & Nakamura, 1937)
 Globocassidulina spherica Eade, 1967
 Globocassidulina subglobella (Saidova, 1975)
 Globocassidulina subglobosa (Brady, 1881) (type, as Cassidulina subglobosa) 
 Globocassidulina toddi (Saidova, 1975)
 Globocassidulina tumida Heron-Allen & Earland, 1922
 Globocassidulina venustas Nomura, 1983
 Globocassidulina virgata (Saidova, 1975)

References

External links 
 
 Globocassidulina at the Worls Register of Marine Species (WoRMS)

Cassidulinidae
Rotaliida genera